The 1958 United States Senate election in Ohio was held on November 4, 1958. Incumbent Senator John W. Bricker was defeated in his bid for a third term by U.S. Representative Stephen M. Young.

This was one of a record twelve seats Democrats gained from the Republican Party in 1958.

General election

Candidates
 John W. Bricker, incumbent Senator since 1947 (Republican)
 Stephen M. Young, candidate for Attorney General in 1956 and former U.S. Representative at-large (Democratic)

Results

See also 
 1958 United States Senate elections

References 

1958
Ohio
United States Senate